Na Sak is a village and tambon (sub-district) of Mae Mo District, in Lampang Province, Thailand. In 2005 it had a population of 6,261. The tambon contains eight villages.

References

Tambon of Lampang province
Populated places in Lampang province